Nielles-lès-Calais (literally Nielles near Calais) is a commune in the Pas-de-Calais department in the Hauts-de-France region of France.

Geography
Nielles-lès-Calais is located 4 miles (6 km) south of Calais, at the junction of the D304 and D245E roads.

Population

Places of interest
 The church of St. Marguerite, dating from the nineteenth century.

See also
Communes of the Pas-de-Calais department

References

Nielleslescalais
Pale of Calais